Neobaculentulus is a genus of proturans in the family Acerentomidae.

Species
 Neobaculentulus cipingensis Yin, 1987
 Neobaculentulus henanensis Yin, 1984
 Neobaculentulus heterotarsus Bu & Xie, 2006
 Neobaculentulus izumi (Imadaté, 1965)

References

Protura